"Coax Me" is a song by Canadian rock band Sloan. It was released as the lead single of their second album Twice Removed. The song peaked at #30 on the Canadian RPM Singles Chart, spending 12 weeks in the top 100. It was also featured on Sloan's compilation album, A Sides Win: Singles 1992-2005.

Content
Chris Murphy has stated that "Coax Me" is "an allegory type song about the difference between being on a major label and playing just for yourself".

Charts

Weekly charts

References

1994 singles
Sloan (band) songs
Songs written by Chris Murphy (Canadian musician)
Geffen Records singles
1994 songs